The Industrial Relations Act 1971 (c.72) was an Act of the Parliament of the United Kingdom, since repealed. It was based on proposals outlined in the governing Conservative Party's manifesto for the 1970 general election. The goal was to stabilize industrial relations by forcing concentration of bargaining power and responsibility in the formal union leadership, using the courts. The act was intensely opposed by unions, and helped undermine the government of Edward Heath. It was repealed by the Trade Union and Labour Relations Act 1974 when the Labour Party returned to government.

Background
The Act followed the Report of the Royal Commission on Trade Unions and Employers’ Associations, led by Lord Donovan, which sought to reduce industrial conflict and introduce a claim for unfair dismissal. However, under a Conservative government, the protection for workers was reduced compared to the Donovan Report proposals, and coupled with suppression of the right to collective bargaining, compared to the previous position.

The Second Reading of the Industrial Relations Bill took place on 14 and 15 of December 1970, and the Third Reading on 24 March 1971.

Contents
Workers were given the right to belong to a registered trade union or not to belong to a registered or unregistered trade union. Collective agreements were to be legally enforceable unless a disclaimer clause was inserted. There was a greater chance that collective 'no strike' clauses could be implied into individual contracts of employment. Only registered trade unions had legal rights and to enjoy legal immunities. Continued registration was dependent on the organisation having rules which specified how, when and by whom, authority was to be exercised, especially concerning the taking of industrial action.

A grievance procedure was required to be included in the written statement of particulars of the contract of employment. A worker under a normal contract of employment could receive compensation for unfair dismissal to encourage the development of dismissal procedures.

The law limited wildcat strikes and prohibited limitations on legitimate strikes. It also established the National Industrial Relations Court, which was empowered to grant injunctions as necessary to prevent injurious strikes and settle a variety of labour disputes.

Trade union reaction
The Trades Union Congress (TUC) under the leadership of General Secretary Vic Feather campaigned against the legislation with a nationwide "Kill the Bill" campaign. On 12 January 1971 the TUC held a 'day of action' in protest, with a march through London. In March, 1,500,000 members of the Amalgamated Engineering Union staged a one-day strike. After the bill received royal assent, in September 1971 the TUC voted to require its member unions not to comply with its provisions (including registering as a union under the Act). The Transport and General Workers Union was twice fined for contempt of court over its refusal to comply. However, some smaller unions did comply and 32 were suspended from membership of the TUC at the 1972 congress.

Protest

Campaigning against the Bill eventually coalesced around individual workers. When the Pentonville Five were arrested for refusing to appear before the National Industrial Relations Court and imprisoned in the summer of 1972, their case received great publicity. Eventually, the Official Solicitor intervened to order their release.

Repeal
Prime Minister Edward Heath called a general election over the issue of "Who Governs Britain?" in February 1974, during a lengthy dispute with the National Union of Mineworkers. Two days before polling day, the Director-General of the Confederation of British Industry Campbell Adamson made a speech in which he said "I should like to see the next government repeal the Act so that we can get proper agreement on what should replace it". Adamson's statement made headlines, and was thought to have damaged the Conservative Party's election prospects. Adamson's statement was repudiated by CBI President Sir Michael Clapham, and he offered to resign (the offer was refused).

The incoming Labour government repealed the Act through the Trade Union and Labour Relations Act 1974.

See also
UK labour law

Notes

References
Moore, Charles. Margaret Thatcher: From Grantham to the Falklands (2013), ch 10
Moran, Michael. The Politics of Industrial Relations: The Origins, Life and Death of the 1971 Industrial Relations Act  (London: Macmillan, 1977) 
Panitch, Leo. Social Democracy and Industrial Militancy: The Labour Party, the Trade Unions, and Incomes Policy, 1945-1974 (Cambridge U. Pr., 1976). 
Rideout, RW  ‘The Industrial Relations Act 1971’ (1971) 34(6) Modern Law Review 655

Industrial Relations and the Limits of Law, Weekes, Mellish, Dickens, Loyd, 1975, p4, Basil Blackwell, Oxford.

United Kingdom Acts of Parliament 1971
United Kingdom labour law
Repealed United Kingdom Acts of Parliament
Labour relations in the United Kingdom
1971 in labor relations